The 2009 Men's EuroHockey Nations Challenge II was the third edition of the EuroHockey Nations Challenge II, the fourth level of the men's European field hockey championships organized by the European Hockey Federation. It was held in Bratislava, Slovakia from 25 to 31 July 2009.

Gibraltar won their first EuroHockey Nations Challenge II title and were promoted to EuroHockey Championship III together with the hosts Slovakia.

Results

Standings

Matches

See also
2009 Men's EuroHockey Nations Challenge I

References

EuroHockey Championship IV
Men 4
EuroHockey Nations Challenge II
EuroHockey Nations Challenge II
International sports competitions hosted by Slovakia
Sports competitions in Bratislava
2000s in Bratislava
Field hockey in Slovakia